The Thirteenth Street Repertory Theatre (13th St Rep) is an Off-Off Broadway theater in New York City founded in 1972 by Edith O'Hara. It is home to the longest running play in Off-Off Broadway history, Israel Horovitz's Line which began its run at the 65-seat venue in 1974.  

The theater is presently under the leadership of Artistic Director Joe John Battista, who mounts premiere productions, experimental plays, and revivals. 13th Street Rep ran its first contracted Off Broadway show in July 2018, the acclaimed BAHR production of Jerry Small's Before We're Gone, directed by Battista.  Other recent productions include a revival of Tom Eyen's Women Behind Bars directed by Joe John Battista and featuring in the ensemble Amy Stiller as Gloria.

History
The theatre is in the basement level of a townhouse located at 50 West 13th Street, parts of which date back to the late 1700s. There exists a trap door in what was formerly a carriage house, now the theater's backstage dressing room, that leads down to a cellar dating back to the Pre-Civil War Era. That cellar was a Greenwich Village way station on the Underground Railroad. 

In the 1940s, 50 West 13th Street was a popular ceramics studio and hub for artists.

From the early 1960s, the building's basement level became a performance space called The 13th Street Theatre, one of many small Off-Off Broadway venues that were springing up in the early years of the Off-Off Broadway Movement. The Drunkard, the first musical by then 19-year old composer Barry Manilow, performed at the space on weekends from 1964–1970, promising its audiences "free beer or root beer" during its two shows a night.

In 1972, Edith O'Hara, a theater maker, former newspaper reporter, and schoolteacher from Idaho, founded the 13th Street Repertory Theatre at 50 West 13th Street as a place for actors, directors, playwrights, and designers to develop and create theater arts in a supportive environment. Her earliest production in New York was Kenn Long and Jim Crozier's musical Touch, whose score went on to earn a Grammy nomination. She championed one of the first productions on the subject of same sex marriage, Bill Solly and Donald Ward's Boy Meets Boy, which afterwards became a hit and moved to a commercial run. In 1974, she presented Israel Horovitz's expressionistic comedy Line, which famously went on to become the longest running play in Off-Off Broadway history. Its final performances were directed by Jay Michaels and co-produced by Mary Elizabeth Micari, using the show's original production scheme.  Performer and TV personality Brother Theodore performed his "stand up tragedy" act there on and off for over twenty years.

The long running hit show, The Accidental Pervert, about a boy’s coming of age via a childhood studded with perpetual pornography, ran at the 13th Street Repertory Theatre from 2012-2015.  It starred Andrew Goffman and was directed by Charles Messina.

In addition to the presentation of new theater works, O'Hara has stressed the importance of entertaining young audiences and educating young artists. She spearheaded a program for young people called Mama Hare's Tree, which continues today as the Kid City Theater after school musical program, presently run by Wendy Tonken. For Edith O'Hara's leadership and artistic contribution she has received citations from President Barack Obama, Governor Andrew Cuomo, and Mayor Michael Bloomberg. 

O’Hara, who in 2016 celebrated her one hundredth birthday, has two daughters, Jill O'Hara and Jenny O'Hara who are Broadway and film actors. Her son is singer/songwriter Jack O'Hara, a founding member of the country rock band Eggs Over Easy.

Tennessee Williams, while giving a talkback after a revival performance of his play Outcry at 13th Street Rep, sat on the edge of its platform and proclaimed that the future of New York Theater is to be found on the small stage.

Current Artistic Director Joe John Battista leads 13th Street Rep in the spirit of the Off-Off Broadway Movement, making it an artistic home where new and classic works may be incubated and presented in artistic freedom, with innovation, and experimentation.

Notable performers
Tennessee Williams
Israel Horovitz
Bette Midler 
Chazz Palminteri
Brother Theodore
Onur Tukel
John Cazale
Charles Ludlam
George Birisima
Joy Garrett
Austin Pendleton
La Forest Cope
Barnard Hughes
Barry Manilow
Richard Dreyfuss
Amy Stiller
Jamie DeRoy
Christopher Meloni
Peter Dizozza
Liche Ariza
Gareth Murphy
Kyle Cassady

References

External links
 Official website
 Facebook

Off-Off-Broadway